The Three Masters of Jiangdong were a group of Chinese literati who lived and wrote during the Ming-Qing transition. They were Gong Dingzi, Wu Weiye, Qian Qianyi. They are partly famous for reviving the Ci (poetry) style of Classical Chinese poetry.

See also
Classical Chinese poetry
Classical Chinese poetry forms

Notes

References
Zhang, Hongsheng (2002). "Gong Dingzi and the Courtesan Gu Mei:  Their Romance and the Revival of the Song Lyric in the Ming-Qing Transition", in Hsiang Lectures on Chinese Poetry, Volume 2, Grace S. Fong, editor. (Montreal: Center for East Asian Research, McGill University).